Sangallaya District is one of thirty-two districts of the province Huarochirí in Peru.

References